Consultation may refer to:

 Public consultation, a process by which the public's input on matters affecting them is sought
 Consultation (Texas), the 1835 Texas meeting of colonists on a proposed rebellion against the Republic of Mexico
 Consultation (doctor), a formal meeting with a medical doctor for discussion or the seeking of advice
 Consultation in object-oriented programming, see Object aggregation
 An event similar to a symposium

See also
 Consultant (disambiguation)